Adam Bessa (born 1992) is a French-Tunisian actor, known for his roles in French and Hollywood productions such as Reda in The Blessed (2017), Kawa in Mosul (2019), soldier Yaz Kahn in Extraction (2020), and Abbas Naziri in the Amazon Prime Video series Hanna. For his performance in Harka (2022), he won the Un Certain Regard Award for Best Performance at the 2022 Cannes Film Festival.

Biography
Bessa was born in Grasse, France in 1992, to an Italian-Tunisian mother and a Tunisian father. Bessa speaks French, Arabic, English and Italian.

Bessa decided to quit law school and pursue his long-standing passion for cinema. He bought a few books on acting and started to teach himself. He studied at Jean Périmony, a theatre school in Paris from 2011 to 2012, but he didn't like the experience. What he proposed in the exercises was too "cinematic", and he was told that he showed too little and wasn't expressive enough, so he quit and went back to Marseille to work as a real estate agent and then as a fishmonger, his other passion. Some time later, a friend asked him to star in a short film. He made his film debut in 2010 in Le Rapport Homme Femme, directed by Olivier André. In 2013, he appeared in Les Mouettes by Claire Fontecave. In 2015, he played Jason in the romantic thriller Of Sound Mind, directed by Simon G. Mueller.

In 2017, he starred as Reda in Sofia Djama's The Blessed. For his performance in the film, he was one of the young actors shortlisted to compete for the César Award for Most Promising Actor, but he did not get the nomination. Bessa kept working as a fishmonger in Marseille even after starring in The Blessed because he did not want to settle in Paris, where he didn't feel good and was wasting away. In 2019, he played police officer Kawa in the Arabic-language American war film Mosul, directed by Matthew Michael Carnahan and based on the 2016 Battle of Mosul.

In 2020, he played soldier Yaz Kahn in the American war film Extraction, directed by Sam Hargrave. He will reprise his role in the upcoming sequel, Extraction 2. In 2021, he appeared as Abbas Naziri in 5 episodes of season 3 of the Amazon Prime Video series Hanna.

In 2022, he starred in three films: Azuro directed by Matthieu Rozé; Le Prix du passage directed by Thierry Binisti; and the drama Harka directed by Lotfy Nathan, for which he won the Un Certain Regard Award for Best Performance at the 2022 Cannes Film Festival for his performance as Ali Hamdi, and was named as one of the Revelations of 2022 and pre-selected to compete for the César Award for Most Promising Actor.

Bessa will next star in Meryam Joobeur's Motherhood, a film about a mother and daughter in an isolated Tunisian village.

Filmography

Feature films

Short films

Television

Theatre

Awards and nominations

References

External links
 
 
 Adam Bessa on UniFrance
 Adam Bessa on AlloCiné
 Adam Bessa on Cineuropa

Living people
1992 births
French male film actors
French male television actors
21st-century French actors
French people of Italian descent
French people of Tunisian descent
People from Grasse